Nicole Gius (born 16 November 1980) is an Italian alpine skier. She was born in Schlanders, Italy. She competed at the 2002 Winter Olympics and the 2010 Winter Olympics.

Career
Nicole Gius has participated in six editions of the World Championships, two of the Winter Olympics. In your career you have achieved four podiums in the World Cup and won seven Italian titles in slalom.

National titles
Giuse has won seven national titles.

Italian Alpine Ski Championships
Downhill: 1999, 2003, 2004, 2005, 2007, 2008, 2009 (7)

References

External links
 
Official Site 

1980 births
Living people
People from Schlanders
Italian female alpine skiers
Alpine skiers at the 2002 Winter Olympics
Alpine skiers at the 2010 Winter Olympics
Olympic alpine skiers of Italy
Alpine skiers of Gruppo Sportivo Esercito
Sportspeople from Südtirol